Patelliconidae is an extinct family of Paleozoic fossil  molluscs. It is not known whether these were Gastropoda or Monoplacophora.

Taxonomy 
The taxonomy of the Gastropoda by Bouchet & Rocroi, 2005 categorizes Patelliconidae within the 
Paleozoic molluscs of uncertain systematic position. This family is unassigned to superfamily. This family has no subfamilies.

Genera 
Genera in the family Patelliconidae include:
 Patelliconus Horný, 1961 - type genus of the family Patelliconidae

References 

Prehistoric gastropods